Imraguen may refer to:
the Imraguen people
the Imraguen language